Arhiva Națională de Filme is a film archive located in Bucharest, Romania. It is a member of the Association of European Film Archives and Cinematheques.

References

External links 
 http://www.anf-cinemateca.ro

Film archives in Europe
Government agencies established in 1957
1957 establishments in Romania
Independent government agencies of Romania
Archives in Romania